The Gulfview Hotel Historic District (also known simply as the Gulfview Hotel) is a U.S. historic district (designated as such on October 22, 1992) located in Fort Walton Beach, Florida. The district is at 12 Miracle Strip Parkway, Southeast. It contains 14 historic buildings.

In 2018, the main hotel building was relocated to 115 Miracle Strip Parkway S.E. The following year, it was opened for multiple usage including a welcome center.

References

External links
 Okaloosa County listings at National Register of Historic Places
 Florida's Office of Cultural and Historical Programs
 Okaloosa County listings
 Great Floridians of Fort Walton Beach

Fort Walton Beach, Florida
Historic districts on the National Register of Historic Places in Florida
Geography of Okaloosa County, Florida
National Register of Historic Places in Okaloosa County, Florida